White Pine is an unincorporated community and census-designated place (CDP) in Ontonagon County in the U.S. state of Michigan.  The CDP had a population of 474 at the 2010 census.  White Pine is located within Carp Lake Township. 

Much of White Pine was developed in the 1950s a housing community for miners at the White Pine mine. Copper mines in Michigan had historically helped provide housing for workers so that miners could have nearby places to live and attract families which were believed to allow more stable workforces with employees staying with the company longer. The site developed as a typical post war suburb. Many homes were single-story ranch homes although a trailer park and apartment complex were also built.  The community never developed fully as the Copper Range Company envisioned. The automobile transformed how workers commuted where previous mine sites had workers walking from nearby housing to the mine, many workers by the 1950s preferred driving 90 miles a day and remain in their current homes rather than move.

History
It was a station on the Chicago, Minneapolis and St. Paul Railway. Thomas H. Wilcox, a mining engineer, found mass copper in the Mineral River and formed the White Pine Copper Company to mine it. The settlement was given a post office as "White Pine Mine" in June 1915.

The community of White Pine was listed as a newly-organized census-designated place for the 2010 census, meaning it now has officially defined boundaries and population statistics for the first time.

Geography

White Pine is located within Carp Lake Township east of the Porcupine Mountains Wilderness State Park. The Copper Range Company operated the White Pine mine in White Pine from 1955 to 1995.

White Pine is served by the 49971 ZIP Code, which is the highest numeric ZIP Code in the state of Michigan.

Demographics

References

External links 
 Mine Site Visit: Copper Range Company White Pine Mine. U.S. Environmental Protection Agency, Office of Solid Waste, observations from EPA site visit May 5 and 6, 1992
Copper mining in Michigan

Unincorporated communities in Ontonagon County, Michigan
Census-designated places in Michigan
Unincorporated communities in Michigan
Census-designated places in Ontonagon County, Michigan